Yelena Dubok (born 3 August 1976) is a Kazakhstani biathlete. She competed at the 1998 Winter Olympics and the 2002 Winter Olympics.

References

1976 births
Living people
Biathletes at the 1998 Winter Olympics
Biathletes at the 2002 Winter Olympics
Kazakhstani female biathletes
Olympic biathletes of Kazakhstan
Place of birth missing (living people)
Asian Games medalists in biathlon
Biathletes at the 1999 Asian Winter Games
Biathletes at the 2003 Asian Winter Games
Asian Games gold medalists for Kazakhstan
Asian Games bronze medalists for Kazakhstan
Medalists at the 1999 Asian Winter Games
Medalists at the 2003 Asian Winter Games